JS Ikazuchi (DD-107) is the seventh ship of the s in service with the Japan Maritime Self-Defense Force. She was commissioned on 14 March 2001.

Design
The hull design was completely renovated from first-generation destroyers. In addition to increasing the size in order to reduce the underwater radiation noise, both the superstructure and hull were inclined to reduce the radar cross-section. However, there is no angled tripod mainmast like the one of the American  because of the heavy weather of the Sea of Japan in winter. Destroyers built under the First Defense Build-up Plan, including the former , adopted a unique long forecastle style called "Oranda-zaka".

The engine arrangement is COGAG as same as Asagiri class, but a pair of engines are updated to Spey SM1C. And the remaining one pair are replaced by LM2500, same as the Kongō class.

Construction and career
Ikazuchi was laid down on 25 February 1998 at Hitachi Zosen Corporation Maizuru as the 1996 plan and launched on 24 June 1999. Commissioned on 14 March 2001, the destroyer was incorporated into the 5th Escort Corps of the 1th Escort Corps and deployed to Yokosuka.

From 15 to 18 August 2020, joint training was conducted with elements of the US Navy which consisted of the aircraft carrier  and several other ships in the sea and airspace south of Okinawa.

Gallery

Citations

References 

 
 
 Saunders, Stephen. IHS Jane's Fighting Ships 2013-2014. Jane's Information Group (2003). 

1999 ships
Murasame-class destroyers (1994)
Ships built by Hitachi Zosen Corporation